Peshawar Gymkhana Ground is a Club cricket ground located in Peshawar, the capital of Khyber Pakhtunkhwa province of Pakistan.

Overview and history 
Peshawar Gymkhana Ground is located adjacent to Arab Niaz Stadium in the vicinity of Shahi Bagh Peshawar.  It is an old British Raj era ground and used to have 2 tennis courts, a pavilion and a cricket ground. The pavilion is named after former Pakistan president Iskander Mirza, who inaugurated it on 10 November 1957. It is very popular among Club cricketers and club cricket is regularly played here.

See also 
 Arbab Niaz Stadium
 Shahi Bagh, Peshawar

References 

Stadiums in Pakistan
Cricket grounds in Pakistan
Sport in Khyber Pakhtunkhwa
Sport in Peshawar